Halmich Park, is located on 13 Mile between Ryan Road and Dequindre Rd. in Warren, Michigan.

Dozens of species of mammals, birds, amphibians, and insects have been documented. Giant speed bumps are peppered throughout the parking lot to dissuade the lead-footed from driving at unsafe speeds.

References

Parks in Michigan
Protected areas of Macomb County, Michigan
Warren, Michigan